Privlaka is a village in Croatia. It located in eastern Slavonia region, 12 km south of the town of Vinkovci. In the 2001 census, there were 3,776 inhabitants, of which 98.68% Croats.

History
One Scordisci archaeological site in Privlaka dating back to late La Tène culture was excavated in the 1970s and 1980s as a part of rescue excavations in eastern Croatia. Archaeological site was a part of the settlement network of Scordisci in the area of Vinkovci.

References

External links
 

Municipalities of Croatia
Populated places in Vukovar-Syrmia County
Populated places in Syrmia
Archaeological sites in Croatia
La Tène culture